Rancho Seco Recreational Park is a recreational area located in the California Central Valley near the Rancho Seco Nuclear Generating Station in Herald, California. It is open to the public for camping, fishing, hiking and water activities. Boats are restricted to outboard electric motors which improves the lake's use as a swimming hole. The lake is fed by the Folsom South Canal.

History
The area surrounding the park was operated by Sacramento County. In the early 1970s, the pond was expanded into a lake to act as backup emergency cooling water supply. In 1992, Sacramento Municipal Utility District (SMUD) took over responsibility for operating the park. In 1993, they began holding a trout fishing competition. The  Howard Ranch Trail and a  nature preserve were added to the park in 2006.

Recreation

Tent camping is available at 31 locations along the south shore of the lake. Each has a barbecue pit and picnic table. Drinking water and flush toilets are located near the sites. RV camping is available at 18 locations. In addition to the tent site amenities, they provide electricity. The park contains a dump station. A general store is open from May through September. Showers, laundry and a recreation room complete the lodging facilities.

Six docks with handicap access are located on the north and south shores of the lake. They can be used for shore fishing or launching a boat. Fishing from boats (electric outboard motors only) allows access to the interior and deeper portions of the lake. A natural population of largemouth bass, crappie, and bluegill are catchable. SMUD stocks the lake with trout and holds its annual trout competition once each year, in the spring. The matches are divided into two age divisions, above and below 16 years old. Each division gives out cash prizes. The adult division prizes go to the top 15 participants while the children's division prizes go to the top six participants. In the December 2005 adult division, Tom Kochis was awarded first place with a  trout. The catches were made from both the shore and boats. The natural population of Florida strain bass feed on the planted trout which allows them to grow to record sizes. "Rancho Seco is a lake with the potential for producing a state or world record largemouth bass," said Dennis Lee, DFG senior fishery biologist. "The lake has the three characteristics needed to produce record class fish: (1) Florida-strain genes; (2) conditions that allow the fish to reach large size; and (3) a good food source, particularly planted rainbows."

A  sandy beach is roped off for swimming with a posted lifeguard during the summer. The water is calm due to the gas motor restrictions on the lake. The motor restriction also makes it a popular spot for wind surfing, kayaking and canoeing. Kayaks and canoes are available for rental.

Howard Ranch Trail
A  trail starts on the north shore of the lake and winds east along the shore then heads out into open ranch land. The trail is gravel and crosses a few low wooden bridges. The main feature of the trail are seasonal vernal pools which support threatened and endangered species including tiger salamander and American spadefoot toad. The park offers guided tours of the trail and vernal pools.

Amanda Blake Wildlife Refuge
The Amanda Blake wildlife refuge is located west of the lake across the dam. Covering  of the park, it hosts captive-bred and rescued endangered animals including oryx and giant emu.

Ecology
The park sits in the middle of an oak woodland with oak trees dominating the horizon when looking away from the lake. Below the oaks, a variety of grasses and flowering plants grow especially near the vernal pool locations. The lake shore has a thick barrier of blackberry bushes everywhere except the dam and the picnic/camping areas. Ducks and geese swim in the recreation areas where the shore is clear. Some people are observed feeding them. Great blue heron eat the fish from the lake. Bald eagles and hawks nest in the trees surrounding the lake. Many insects are present including dragonflies and grasshoppers. Raccoons are a notable mammal using the lake as a water source, with their droppings dispersed along the narrow animal trails cutting across the park.

The "Rancho Raptor" Sightings 
On December 27 2021, multiple visitors of Rancho Seco Recreational Park reported seeing a large avian creature fly above the Rancho Seco Nuclear Generator Station towards the tent campgrounds. The creature was allegedly "abnormally large" with its wingspan measuring upwards of 15 feet, according to one visitor, with others affirming his claim of size of the animal. The creature was rumored to have soared slightly above the water, heading towards the southern end of the lake, before flying back east, away from the nuclear generator station. Witnesses reported hearing a high pitched screech as the creature flew away. Visitors who followed the route of the creature were unable to obtain evidence of the encounter, aside from a large feather, which was later identified as the feather from a ferruginous hawk. Though some witnesses and enthusiasts believe that the "Rancho Raptor" could be mythologically related to a thunderbird, naturalists claim that the animal was simply a ferruginous hawk afflicted with a genetic mutation that drastically altered its size, or that the creature was a large California condor. Those that support the notion that the "Rancho Raptor" is a new cryptid have refuted the latter claim, citing that California condors do not make audibly significant sounds, and have proposed instead that the creature was another sighting of the Mothman. They claim that because there has been an alleged sighting of the Mothman in Sacramento, California and because the Mothman has also been reported to have high pitched screech, it is not unlikely that the infamous cryptid had returned. No other reports have been made of the "Rancho Raptor" since 2021.

The "Preston Parasite" Sightings 
In April 2019, spectators of the annual Rancho Seco Fishing Derby reported seeing a large, aquatic, serpentine creature swimming through the waters of the park. Witnesses say that the animal was gray in color, roughly three to five feet long, and roughly one foot wide. The creature supposedly breached the surface of the water three times, revealing its body to onlookers for about ten seconds before descending back into the depths of the lake. It was spotted near the docks on the north shore of the lake, seemingly swimming away from the land towards the western end of the lake, though its final destination was unclear. Onlookers were quoted as saying that the creature resembled an "enormous leech" with a "slimy body," dark spots speckling its rear. These comments and the emphasis on the dark spots have led naturalists and theorists to believe that spectators observed an especially large trout, perhaps suffering from external wounds that may have originated either from a severe case of fin-rot or injury. A family visiting from Ione, California remarked that the creature closely resembled a creature with similar likeness that they had reportedly seen in the Preston Reservoir, a man made lake near the Preston School of Industry located 13.3 miles east of Rancho Seco Recreational Park. As a result of these stories, witnesses began informally referring to the creature as the "Preston Parasite." Despite onlookers photographing the water when the creature would surface, there have been no released photos of the creature, and there have been no reports of the animal since. The claims of the existence of the creature are thereby unsubstantiated.

See also
List of lakes in California

References

Parks in Sacramento County, California
Regional parks in California